Penobscot Island Air is a small regional airline based at Knox County Regional Airport, Maine, United States (RKD) operating from a private terminal. The airline operates scheduled service to the islands in Maine's Penobscot Bay and offers private charter land and seaplane flights throughout the region.

Fleet
Penobscot Island Air operates a fleet of Cessna aircraft equipped with both wheels and floats. The Penobscot Island Air fleet includes the following aircraft types.

Cessna 206
Cessna 207
Cessna 208 Caravan

Destinations
Penobscot Island Air operates scheduled cargo and passenger flights to the following destinations within the state of Maine.

Rockland
Matinicus Isle
Vinalhaven
North Haven
Isleboro

Charter flights are routinely flown to a number of airports including:

Bangor
Bar Harbor
Belfast
Biddeford
Big Green
Brunswick Executive
Criehaven
Portland
Stonington
Wiscasset

Accidents
On October 5, 2011, a Cessna 207A crashed while attempting to land at Matinicus. The pilot and sole occupant of the cargo flight were killed.
On July 17, 2011, a Cessna 206G made a water landing shortly after takeoff from Matinicus. The four occupants of the aircraft were rescued from the ocean.
On June 26, 2017, a Cessna 206 crashed shortly after takeoff from Vinalhaven. The pilot and sole occupant were taken to the Knox County Hospital with non-life-threatening injuries.
On September 1, 2017, a Cessna 206 crash near Harpswell, Maine

References

External links
Penobscot Island Air Website
Flight Delay Compensation Guide

Transportation in Knox County, Maine
Airlines based in Maine
Regional airlines of the United States
Airlines established in 2004
2004 establishments in Maine
American companies established in 2004